Odd Fellows Cemetery may refer to:

Odd Fellows Cemetery (Farmville, Virginia) where James W. D. Bland's gravesite is one of the notable burials
 IOOF Cemetery (Georgetown, Texas)
 Odd Fellows Cemetery (San Francisco, California), location of a Neptune Society Columbarium
 Odd Fellows Cemetery (Los Angeles, California)
 Odd Fellows Rest Cemetery, New Orleans, Louisiana, NRHP-listed, in Orleans Parish
 Odd Fellows and Confederate Cemetery, Grenada, Mississippi, NRHP-listed, in Grenada County
 Odd Fellows Cemetery (Starkville, Mississippi), NRHP-listed, in Oktibbeha County
 Odd Fellows' Cemetery Mound, Newtown, Ohio, NRHP-listed
Medford IOOF Cemetery, Medford, Oregon, NRHP-listed
 Odd Fellows Cemetery (Philadelphia), Pennsylvania

See also
List of Odd Fellows cemeteries